The  is a railway line in Japan which connects Matsumoto Station in Nagano Prefecture with Itoigawa Station in Niigata Prefecture. There are two operators on the line: East Japan Railway Company (JR East) operates the section north of Minami-Otari Station in Otari, Nagano Prefecture, and West Japan Railway Company (JR West) operates the remaining section. Minami-Otari is the boundary for the two companies. The section of the line, operated by JR East, between Minami-Otari and Matsumoto is electrified and trains are fairly regular along this section. The JR West section from Minami-Otari to Itoigawa, however, is not electrified and is used very little, compared to the electrified JR East section. Trains run far less regularly along this part.

Route data
Operators, services:
East Japan Railway Company (Services and tracks)
Matsumoto — Minami-Otari: 70.1 km
West Japan Railway Company (Services and tracks)
Minami-Otari — Itoigawa: 35.3 km
Stations:
JR East: 34
JR West: 8 including Itoigawa, excluding Minami-Otari
Double-tracked section: None
Electrification: Matsumoto — Minami-Otari (1,500 V DC)  Minami-Otari — Itoigawa (None)
Railway signalling:
Matsumoto — Itoigawa: Automatic Train Stop, S-type

Services

JR East section
Limited express, Rapid
, the following services are operated.

Local
Matsumoto – Shinano-Ōmachi: every 30-60 minutes 
Shinano-Ōmachi – Minami-Otari: every 60-180 minutes

JR West section
Local
Minami-Otari - Itoigawa: every 120-180 minutes

No limited-stop services like rapids operate on the JR West section. All trains are local services, which stop at every station.

Rolling stock

JR East section
E127-100 series EMU
211 series EMU
E353 series EMU - Azusa

JR West section
KiHa 120 series DMU

Stations

JR East section
All stations are within Nagano Prefecture.

A: Limited Express Azusa
R: Rapid
Trains stop at stations marked "O", skip at stations marked "|".

Closed Stations
Yanabaskijōmae Station closed on 16 March 2019

JR West section

History
The company was nationalised in 1937 and was not the same entity as the present Shinano Railway.

The rest of the line was built by the Japanese Government Railways (JGR) and the Japanese National Railways (JNR) between 1929 and 1957. The Shinano-Ōmachi to Minami Otari section was electrified between 1959 and 1967. CTC signalling was commissioned in 1983, and freight services ceased in 1987.

Following privatization of JNR on 1 April 1987, the line was divided and assigned to JR East and JR West.

Station numbering was introduced on the line by JR East from 12 December 2016, with stations numbered in sequence from 9 (Minami-Otari) to 42 (Matsumoto).

See also

List of railway lines in Japan

References

 
Lines of East Japan Railway Company
Lines of West Japan Railway Company
Railway lines in Nagano Prefecture
Rail transport in Niigata Prefecture
Railway lines opened in 1915
1067 mm gauge railways in Japan